Marine Observation Squadron 7 (VMO-7) was an observation squadron of the United States Marine Corps during World War II.  They were active for a year and a half during which time they saw action during the Battle of Okinawa.  The squadron was quickly deactivated following the end of the war.

History
VMO-7 was formed on December 15, 1944 at Marine Corps Base Quantico, Virginia.  After a short period of training they moved to Marine Corps Air Station Ewa on February 27, 1945 sailing on board the British escort carrier HMS Ranee (D03).  Another two months of training in Hawaii saw them depart Pearl Harbor on April 17, 1945 and sail for Okinawa.   The squadron filtered onto the island from 7 – 11 May and quickly began flights spotting targets for III Amphibious Corps’ artillery.  During the period between June 11 to June 22 the squadron made 271 CASEVAC flights from a dirt strip in Naha taking 369 casualties back to hospitals in the rear areas.  They were engaged in combat operation on Okinawa until June 21, 1945.  During the battle the squadron flew 300 combat hours without losing a pilot or plane.  They remained on the island for the rest of the war and were deactivated on November 16, 1945

Awards
   Asiatic-Pacific Campaign Medal with one bronze star
   World War II Victory Medal

See also

 United States Marine Corps Aviation
 List of United States Marine Corps aircraft squadrons
 List of decommissioned United States Marine Corps aircraft squadrons

References
Notes

Bibliography

Web

Observation7
Inactive units of the United States Marine Corps